The 2005–06 Columbus Blue Jackets season was the sixth National Hockey League season (fifth season of play) in Columbus, Ohio. The team's final position in the standings was hampered by a slow start that resulted from losing a number of key players, including goals leader Rick Nash, to injury. Once these players returned to the roster, the team had one of the strongest second halves in the NHL. Despite the strong finish, the Blue Jackets finished outside of the playoffs for the fifth consecutive season. However, the strong finish did lead to raised expectations for the 2006–07 season.

Regular season
Prior to the start of the season the team announced Luke Richardson would remain team captain and Adam Foote, Rick Nash, and David Vyborny would serve as alternate captains on a rotating basis. Richardson resigned the captaincy after being a healthy scratch for Columbus’ November 25 game against the Colorado Avalanche. Foote was named the team’s new captain on December 6.

Season standings

Schedule and results

|- align="center" bgcolor="#ffbbbb"
| 1 || October 5 || Columbus || 3 – 2 || Washington || || Leclaire || 16,325 || 0–1–0 || 0 || 
|- align="center" bgcolor="#ffbbbb" 
| 2 || October 7 || Calgary || 3 – 1 || Columbus || || Denis || 18,136 || 0–2–0 || 0 || 
|- align="center" bgcolor="#bbffbb" 
| 3 || October 9 || Columbus || 3 – 2 || Chicago || || Denis || 11,062 || 1–2–0 || 2 || 
|- align="center" bgcolor="#ffbbbb" 
| 4 || October 12 || Columbus || 1 – 4 || San Jose || || Denis || 17,496 || 1–3–0 || 2 || 
|- align="center" bgcolor="#ffbbbb" 
| 5 || October 14 || Columbus || 3 – 4 || Anaheim || || Leclaire || 12,930 || 1–4–0 || 2 || 
|- align="center" bgcolor="#ffbbbb" 
| 6 || October 16 || Columbus || 1 – 3 || Los Angeles || || Denis || 17,156 || 1–5–0 || 2 || 
|- align="center" bgcolor="#bbffbb" 
| 7 || October 21 || San Jose || 1 – 4 || Columbus || || Denis || 15,388 || 2–5–0 || 4 || 
|- align="center" bgcolor="#ffbbbb" 
| 8 || October 22 || Detroit || 6 – 0 || Columbus || || Denis || 18,136 || 2–6–0 || 4 || 
|- align="center" bgcolor="#ffbbbb" 
| 9 || October 24 || Detroit || 6 – 2 || Columbus || || Denis || 16,098 || 2–7–0 || 4 || 
|- align="center" bgcolor="#bbffbb" 
| 10 || October 26 || Nashville || 2 – 3 || Columbus || OT || Prusek || 15,110 || 3–7–0 || 6 || 
|- align="center" bgcolor="#bbffbb" 
| 11 || October 28 || Minnesota || 1 – 2 || Columbus || SO || Prusek || 15,669 || 4–7–0 || 8 || 
|- align="center" bgcolor="#ffbbbb" 
| 12 || October 29 || Columbus || 1 – 3 || Minnesota || || Prusek || 18,568 || 4–8–0 || 8 || 
|-

|- align="center" bgcolor="#ffbbbb" 
| 13 || November 1 || Columbus || 1 – 5 || Edmonton || || Denis || 16,839 || 4–9–0 || 8 || 
|- align="center" bgcolor="#ffbbbb" 
| 14 || November 3 || Columbus || 1 – 2 || Calgary || || Denis || 19,289 || 4–10–0 || 8 || 
|- align="center" bgcolor="#ffbbbb" 
| 15 || November 4 || Columbus || 3 – 5 || Vancouver || || Denis || 18,630 || 4–11–0 || 8 || 
|- align="center" bgcolor="#bbffbb" 
| 16 || November 9 || St. Louis || 1 – 3 || Columbus || || Denis || 16,058 || 5–11–0 || 10 || 
|- align="center" bgcolor="#ffbbbb" 
| 17 || November 11 || Edmonton || 3 – 1 || Columbus || || Denis || 18,136 || 5–12–0 || 10 || 
|- align="center" bgcolor="#ffbbbb" 
| 18 || November 13 || Los Angeles || 8 – 2 || Columbus || || Prusek || 16,174 || 5–13–0 || 10 || 
|- align="center" bgcolor="#ffbbbb" 
| 19 || November 16 || St. Louis || 2 – 0 || Columbus || || Denis || 15,802 || 5–14–0 || 10 || 
|- align="center" bgcolor="#ffbbbb"
| 20 || November 18 || Columbus || 3 – 6 || Dallas || || Prusek || 18,532 || 5–15–0 || 10 || 
|- align="center" bgcolor="#ffbbbb" 
| 21 || November 20 || Columbus || 1 – 5 || Phoenix || || Denis || 13,953 || 5–16–0 || 10 || 
|- align="center" bgcolor="#ffbbbb" 
| 22 || November 23 || Nashville || 4 – 2 || Columbus || || Leclaire || 15,833 || 5–17–0 || 10 || 
|- align="center" bgcolor="#ffbbbb" 
| 23 || November 25 || Colorado || 5 – 0 || Columbus || || Leclaire || 18,136 || 5–18–0 || 10 || 
|- align="center" bgcolor="#bbffbb" 
| 24 || November 26 || Columbus || 4 – 3 || St. Louis || || Prusek || 15,002 || 6–18–0 || 12 || 
|- align="center" bgcolor="#bbffbb" 
| 25 || November 30 || Columbus || 3 – 2 || Minnesota || SO || Leclaire || 18,568 || 7–18–0 || 14 || 
|-

|- align="center" bgcolor="#ffbbbb" 
| 26 || December 1 || Columbus || 1 – 4 || St. Louis || || Leclaire || 12,307 || 7–19–0 || 14 || 
|- align="center" bgcolor="#bbffbb" 
| 27 || December 8 || NY Islanders || 3 – 4 || Columbus || SO || Leclaire || 15,728 || 8–19–0 || 16 || 
|- align="center" bgcolor="#ffbbbb" 
| 28 || December 9 || Columbus || 2 – 5 || Atlanta || || Leclaire || 14,260 || 8–20–0 || 16 || 
|- align="center" bgcolor="#bbffbb" 
| 29 || December 11 || New Jersey || 2 – 3 || Columbus || OT || Denis || 17,157 || 9–20–0 || 18 || 
|- align="center" bgcolor="#ffbbbb"
| 30 || December 13 || Philadelphia || 3 – 1 || Columbus || || Denis || 16,263 || 9–21–0 || 18 || 
|- align="center" bgcolor="#ffbbbb"
| 31 || December 15 || Columbus || 1 – 2 || Carolina || || Leclaire || 11,069 || 9–22–0 || 18 || 
|- align="center" bgcolor="#ffbbbb" 
| 32 || December 17 || Columbus || 3 – 7 || Nashville || || Denis || 16,020 || 9–23–0 || 18 || 
|- align="center"
| 33 || December 20 || Columbus || 3 – 4 || Detroit || SO || Leclaire || 20,066 || 9–23–1 || 19 || 
|- align="center" bgcolor="#ffbbbb" 
| 34 || December 21 || Dallas || 5 – 3 || Columbus || || Leclaire || 16,859 || 9–24–1 || 19 || 
|- align="center" bgcolor="#ffbbbb"
| 35 || December 23 || Nashville || 5 – 4 || Columbus || || Denis || 16,330 || 9–25–1 || 19 || 
|- align="center" bgcolor="#bbffbb"
| 36 || December 26 || Chicago || 3 – 4 || Columbus || OT || Denis || 17,441 || 10–25–1 || 21 || 
|- align="center" bgcolor="#bbffbb"
| 37 || December 28 || Anaheim || 0 – 1 || Columbus || || Denis || 17,387 || 11–25–1 || 23 || 
|- align="center" bgcolor="#bbffbb"
| 38 || December 30 || Columbus || 3 – 2 || Chicago || || Denis || 13,229 || 12–25–1 || 25 || 
|- align="center" bgcolor="#ffbbbb"
| 39 || December 31 || Columbus || 2 – 5 || Detroit || || Denis || 20,066 || 12–26–1 || 25 || 
|-

|- align="center" bgcolor="#ffbbbb"
| 40 || January 5 || Columbus || 3 – 6 || San Jose || || Denis || 15,275 || 12–27–1 || 25 || 
|- align="center"
| 41 || January 7 || Columbus || 2 – 3 || Colorado || SO || Leclaire || 18,007 || 12–27–2 || 26 || 
|- align="center" bgcolor="#bbffbb"
| 42 || January 8 || Columbus || 2 – 5 || Phoenix || || Denis || 14,436 || 13–27–2 || 28 || 
|- align="center" bgcolor="#bbffbb"
| 43 || January 11 || Pittsburgh || 1 – 6 || Columbus || || Leclaire || 18,136 || 14–27–2 || 30 || 
|- align="center" bgcolor="#ffbbbb"
| 44 || January 13 || Columbus || 2 – 4 || Tampa Bay || || Denis || 20,425 || 14–28–2 || 30 || 
|- align="center"  bgcolor="#bbffbb"
| 45 || January 14 || Columbus || 5 – 4 || Florida || OT || Leclaire || 17,991 || 15–28–2 || 32 || 
|- align="center"  bgcolor="#bbffbb" 
| 46 || January 16 || NY Rangers || 3 – 4 || Columbus || || Denis || 16,355 || 16–28–2|| 34 || 
|- align="center"  bgcolor="ffbbbb"
| 47 || January 18 || Detroit || 4 – 0 || Columbus || || Leclaire || 17,089 || 16–29–2|| 34 || 
|- align="center"  bgcolor="#bbffbb"
| 48 || January 20 || St. Louis || 3 – 4 || Columbus || SO || Denis || 17,268 || 17–29–2 || 36 || 
|- align="center"  bgcolor="#ffbbbb"
| 49 || January 21 || Columbus || 2 – 7 || Nashville || || Leclaire || 15,416 || 17–30–2 || 36 || 
|- align="center"  bgcolor="#bbffbb"
| 50 || January 24 || Vancouver || 5 – 6 || Columbus || || Denis || 16,192 || 18–30–2 || 38 || 
|- align="center"  bgcolor="#bbffbb"
| 51 || January 27 || Minnesota || 3 – 4 || Columbus || || Leclaire || 17,153 || 19–30–2|| 40 || 
|- align="center"  bgcolor="#bbffbb"
| 52 || January 28 || Nashville || 3 – 4 || Columbus || || Denis || 18,136 || 20–30–2 || 42 || 
|-

|- align="center"  bgcolor="#bbffbb"  
| 53 || February 1 || Columbus || 2 – 1 || Calgary || SO || Denis || 19,289 || 21–30–2 || 44 || 
|- align="center"  bgcolor="#bbffbb"
| 54 || February 2 || Columbus || 2 – 1 || Edmonton || SO || Denis || 16,839|| 22–30–2 || 46 || 
|- align="center"  bgcolor="#ffbbbb"
| 55 || February 6 || Columbus || 4 – 7 || Vancouver || || Denis || 18,630|| 22–31–2|| 46 || 
|- align="center"  bgcolor="#bbffbb"
| 56 || February 8 || Los Angeles || 4 – 7 || Columbus || || Denis || 16,162|| 23–31–2 || 48 || 
|- align="center"  bgcolor="#ffbbbb"
| 57 || February 10 || Colorado || 4 – 1 || Columbus || || Denis || 18,136|| 23–32–2|| 48 || 
|- align="center"  bgcolor="#ffbbbb"
| 58 || February 11 || Columbus || 2 – 5 || Nashville || || Denis || 17,113 || 23–33–2|| 48 || 
|-

|- align="center"  bgcolor="#ffbbbb"
| 59 || March 2 || Columbus || 0 – 1 || Colorado || || Leclaire || 18,007 || 23–34–2|| 48 || 
|- align="center"  bgcolor="#ffbbbb"
| 60 || March 4 || Columbus || 2 – 3 || Los Angeles || || Denis || 17,238 || 23–35–2|| 48 || 
|- align="center"  bgcolor="#bbffbb" 
| 61 || March 5 || Columbus || 3 – 2 || Anaheim || SO || Leclaire || 16,124 || 24–35–2 || 50 || 
|- align="center" bgcolor="#ffbbbb"
| 62 || March 7 || Chicago || 3 – 1 || Columbus  || || Denis || 16,137 || 24–36–2 || 50 || 
|- align="center" bgcolor="#bbffbb"
| 63 || March 9 || Phoenix || 4 – 5 || Columbus || || Leclaire || 17,066 || 25–36–2 || 52 || 
|- align="center" bgcolor="#bbffbb"
| 64 || March 11 || Edmonton || 3 – 4 || Columbus || OT || Denis || 18,136 || 26–36–2 ||54 || 
|- align="center" 
| 65 || March 13 || Columbus || 2 – 3 || St. Louis || OT || Leclaire || 12,130 || 26–36–3 || 55 || 
|- align="center"  bgcolor="#ffbbbb"
| 66 || March 15 || Columbus || 2 – 3 || Chicago || || Denis || 10,130 || 26–37–3 || 55 || 
|- align="center"  bgcolor="#ffbbbb"
| 67 || March 17 || Vancouver || 3 – 2 || Columbus || || Leclaire || 16,163 || 26–38–3 || 55 || 
|- align="center"  bgcolor="#ffbbbb"
| 68 || March 19 || Anaheim || 3 – 4 || Columbus || || Denis || 16,519 || 26–39–3 || 55 || 
|- align="center"  bgcolor="#ffbbbb"
| 69 || March 21 || Phoenix || 5 – 2 || Columbus || || Leclaire || 15,581 || 26–40–3 || 55 || 
|- align="center"  bgcolor="#bbffbb"
| 70 || March 24 || Calgary || 2 – 3 || Columbus || || Denis || 17,041 || 27–40–3 || 57 || 
|- align="center"  bgcolor="#bbffbb"
| 71 || March 25 || Columbus || 5 – 4 || Detroit || SO || Leclaire || 20,066 || 28–40–3 || 59 || 
|- align="center"  bgcolor="#bbffbb"
| 72 || March 28 || San Jose || 1 – 4 || Columbus || || Denis || 16,094 || 29–40–3 || 61 || 
|- align="center"  bgcolor="#bbffbb"
| 73 || March 31 || Columbus || 4 – 2 || St. Louis || || Leclaire || 14,101 || 30–40–3 || 63 || 
|-

|- align="center"  bgcolor="#bbffbb"
| 74 || April 1 || Chicago || 2 – 5 || Columbus || || Denis || 17,394 || 31–40–3 || 65 || 
|- align="center"  bgcolor="#bbffbb"
| 75 || April 3 || Columbus || 3 – 1 || Nashville || || Leclaire || 12,073 || 32–40–3 || 67 || 
|- align="center" 
| 76 || April 7 || Columbus || 5 – 6 || Detroit || SO || Denis || 20,066 || 32–40–4 || 68 || 
|- align="center"  bgcolor="#ffbbbb"
| 77 || April 8 || Detroit || 4 – 2 || Columbus || || Leclaire || 18,136 || 32–41–4 || 68 || 
|- align="center"  bgcolor="#ffbbbb"
| 78 || April 11 || Columbus || 2 – 3 || Dallas || || Denis || 18,543 || 32–42–4 || 68 || 
|- align="center"  bgcolor="#bbffbb"
| 79 || April 13 || St. Louis || 1 – 4 || Columbus || || Leclaire || 16,262 || 33–42–4 || 70 || 
|- align="center"  bgcolor="#bbffbb"
| 80 || April 15 || Chicago || 2 – 5 || Columbus || || Denis || 16,555 || 34–42–4 || 72 || 
|- align="center"  bgcolor="#ffbbbb"
| 81 || April 16 || Columbus || 3 – 4 || Chicago || || Leclaire || 10,733 || 34–43–4 || 72 || 
|- align="center"  bgcolor="#bbffbb"
| 82 || April 18 || Dallas || 4 – 5 || Columbus || OT || Denis || 17,103 || 35–43–4 || 74 || 
|-

|-
| Legend:

Player statistics

Scoring
 Position abbreviations: C = Center; D = Defense; G = Goaltender; LW = Left Wing; RW = Right Wing
  = Joined team via a transaction (e.g., trade, waivers, signing) during the season. Stats reflect time with the Blue Jackets only.
  = Left team via a transaction (e.g., trade, waivers, release) during the season. Stats reflect time with the Blue Jackets only.

Goaltending

Awards and records

Awards

Milestones

Transactions
The Blue Jackets were involved in the following transactions from February 17, 2005, the day after the 2004–05 NHL season was officially cancelled, through June 19, 2006, the day of the deciding game of the 2006 Stanley Cup Finals.

Trades

Players acquired

Players lost

Signings

Draft picks
Columbus' picks at the 2005 NHL Entry Draft in Ottawa, Ontario. The Blue Jackets picked sixth in odd rounds, 25th in even rounds.

Farm teams

Syracuse Crunch
The Syracuse Crunch are the Blue Jackets American Hockey League affiliate for the sixth season.

Dayton Bombers
The Dayton Bombers of the ECHL are also entering their sixth season as an affiliate of the Blue Jackets.

See also
2005–06 NHL season

Notes

References

Columbus Blue Jackets seasons
Columbus Blue Jackets season
Colum
Columbus Blue Jackets
Columbus Blue Jackets